Apple TV is a digital media player and microconsole.

Apple TV may also refer to:

 Apple TV app, a media player application 
 Apple TV Software, the operating system for earlier Apple TV hardware
 Apple TV+, a video on demand streaming television service

See also
 Macintosh TV, a personal computer with integrated television capabilities released in 1993
 Apple Interactive Television Box, a prototype television set-top box 1994–1995

Apple Inc.